Donya Aziz is a Pakistani politician who has been a member of the National Assembly of Pakistan from 2002 to 2013.

Early life, family and education

Political career
She was elected to the National Assembly of Pakistan as a candidate of Pakistan Muslim League (Q) on a seat reserved for women from Punjab in the 2002 Pakistani general election. During her tenure as Member of the National Assembly, she served as the federal Parliamentary Secretary for Population Welfare.

She was re-elected to the National Assembly of Pakistan as a candidate of Pakistan Muslim League (Q) on a seat reserved for women from Punjab in the 2008 Pakistani general election.

References

Living people
Pakistan Muslim League (Q) politicians
Pakistani MNAs 2008–2013
Punjabi people
Women members of the National Assembly of Pakistan
Pakistani MNAs 2002–2007
Year of birth missing (living people)
21st-century Pakistani women politicians